Huinnyeoul Culture Village(흰여울문화마을) is a town of Yeongseon-dong, Yeongdo District, Busan, South Korea. Located on a high cliff, people can see the sea of Busan at a glance. It is called Korea's Santorini. It is also the background of a movie The Attorney.

See also 

 The Attorney
 Gamcheon Culture Village
 Nameless Gangster: Rules of the Time

References 

Yeongdo District
Busan